Road P-65 is a highway of regional significance in Ukraine. It connects two border crossings between Russia and Ukraine, "Mykolaivka" and "Katerinovka". The road passes through the Chernihiv and Sumy regions and goes across Semenivka, Novhorod-Siverskyi, Shostka and Hlukhiv.

Whole length 
The section from Hlukhiv to the Russian border is part of European route E38.

Main route 

Route map: :

Notes

References
 
 
 
 
 

Roads in Chernihiv Oblast
Roads in Sumy Oblast